The Geneva Gown, also called a pulpit gown, pulpit robe, or preaching robe, is an ecclesiastical garment customarily worn by Ordained Ministers and Accredited Lay Preachers in the Christian Churches that arose out of the historic Protestant Reformation.  It is particularly associated with Protestant Churches of the Reformed, Methodist, Unitarian and Free Christian traditions.

Description 
The gown, analogous to the Western doctoral robe and similar to American judicial attire, is constructed from heavy material, most appropriately of black color, and usually features double-bell sleeves with a cuff (mimicking the cassock once worn under it) and velvet facings (or panels) running over the neck and down both sides of the front enclosure length-wise, mimicking the ecclesiastical tippet once worn over it.

A minister who has earned an academic doctoral degree in any of the theological disciplines (DD, D.Min., STD, Th.D.) or in the liberal arts and sciences (PhD, DA) may adorn each sleeve with three chevrons or bars of velvet cloth in black or scarlet red, signifying senior scholarly credentials. The velvet panels of the gown's facings match the chevrons. Some doctoral gowns also have black velvet chevrons and panels, and adorned with red piping.

Contemporary choir robes and other expressions of lay vesture are inspired by, but remain distinct from, the Geneva gown.

Purpose 
The simple yet dignified gown is meant to convey the authority and solemn duty of the Ordained or Accredited Lay Preacher in his ministry as called by God to proclaim the Gospel of Jesus and preach the biblical Word of God, the bearer being a learned minister of the Word and teaching elder (presbyter) over the Church faithful.

Worn over street clothes, traditionally a cassock but today more commonly a business suit with or without clerical collar, the gown eschews ostentation, obscuring individual grooming and concealing fashion preferences, and instead draws attention to the wearer's office and not the person.

History 
The Reformed Protestant Reformers of western Europe rejected the traditional dress worn by members of the Roman Catholic Church because they disagreed with what it represented. Instead, they began attending church in their daily clothes, which happened to be long black robes due to the fact that the majority of the Reformation leaders were of the scholarly class. This was eventually defined as liturgical dress, and the traditional garment for those in leadership roles.

Usage 
By convention a Minister or Lay Preacher may wear the gown only at expressly Christian services of worship wherein a sermon, that is an exposition of Scripture, is delivered.

With the gown a minister may also wear preaching bands and a liturgical stole. A Lay Preacher may also wear a preaching scarf.  Less typically a minister may choose to put on white gloves when distributing the elements of the Lord's Supper, a practice predating the advent of stainless steel chalices and communion trays.

For historical and theological reasons the gown is most typical of Congregational, Presbyterian and Reformed churches, that is those congregations primarily influenced by Calvinist formulations of Christian doctrine and church order. Though historically also common with Baptist and Methodist clergy, its use waned in the 20th century. During that century, there was a general shift toward a less formal religious service; this movement spread across most denominational lines.

Another liturgical movement which took place was a renewed interest in medieval liturgical practices. This was an outgrowth of the 19th century Oxford Movement which took place in the Church of England.  During the later half of the 20th century, the ongoing effects of this movement began to spark interest for liturgical reforms in non-Anglican denominations in America (particularly the United Methodist Church and the Presbyterian Church). Today, it is not uncommon to find the alb worn by many mainline Protestant clergy during services. This, however, should not be seen as a revival of historical practice, but as part of general liturgical reforms which were occurring in denominations at that time.

The typical clerical dress of an Anglican minister during the 18th century was a cassock, Geneva gown, and neck bands. For this reason, the gown is sometimes (though rarely) found in "low church" parishes of the Anglican Communion, many whom desire a continuity with the stauncher Protestant stances of the church before the influence of the Oxford Movement. In these parishes it is usual for the gown to be worn for preaching, whilst the surplice is worn for the liturgy. It is also widely used in many African-American congregations regardless of denominational affiliation. Use of the gown has also waned in Lutheran churches, though it seemed to be common during the 19th and first half of the 20th centuries. Rarely is this uniquely Protestant attire worn by Eastern Orthodox or Roman Catholic.

In the Church of Scotland which is Presbyterian, it is normal for the Geneva gown to be vented (opened at the front), sleeveless, and worn over a cassock.  The cassock, usually black (like its counterpart in the Church of England), also comes in blue (signifying the Royal Blue in the Flag of Scotland, which bears the Cross of St. Andrew, the patron saint of Scotland), or scarlet red signifying a King"s Chaplain.  This practice is sometimes followed by some English Methodists and American Presbyterians, although wearing the more familiar American-style gown, including wearing a black cassock in Roman or Anglican cut.

Trends 
United or Uniting churches which contain an episcopalian element have in some countries (notably Australia; generally not in Canada) tended to abandon the Geneva gown in favor of the more symbolically ecumenical alb and cincture, whereas some non-united evangelical congregations have for various reasons done away with distinct ministerial dress altogether.

Some rabbis and spiritual leaders of other non-Christian faiths have fashioned their modern religious garb patterned after the historic Geneva gown.

Among the Paleo-orthodoxy and emerging church movements in Protestant and evangelical churches, particularly Methodist, Lutheran, and Presbyterian, many clergy are reclaiming not only the traditional Eucharist vestments of alb and chasuble, but also cassock and surplice (typically a full-length Old English style) with appropriate liturgical stole, and cassock and Geneva gown for a Liturgy or Service of the Word.

References 

 The Advent of the Use of the Geneva Gown in Public Worship by D.G. Laird, a United Church of Canada minister.
 A Defense of the Use of the Ministerial Robe in Public Worship by Jeff Myers, a teaching elder of the Presbyterian Church in America.
 Why does the minister wear a robe?, Redeemer Presbyterian Church, Overland Park, Kan.
 Material History of American Religion Project: Ministerial Dress by Nolan B. Harmon — an advice book published in 1950 for young American clergy.

Protestant vestments
History of clothing (Western fashion)
History of fashion
Methodism
Presbyterianism